Daniel Sousa is a Portuguese short film director. Sousa and fellow producer Dan Golden were nominated for a 2014 Academy Award for Best Animated Short Film for the film Feral.

Sousa is an alumnus of the Rhode Island School of Design (RISD), where he teaches animation.

References

External links
 Daniel Sousa's official website

Rhode Island School of Design alumni
Rhode Island School of Design faculty
Living people
American film directors
Portuguese animators
Year of birth missing (living people)
Place of birth missing (living people)

Portuguese people of Cape Verdean descent